Hemidactylus rishivalleyensis is a species of house gecko from India.

References

External links
 Reptile Database

Hemidactylus
Reptiles described in 2020
Endemic fauna of India